Hippie trail (also the overland) is the name given to the overland journey taken by members of the hippie subculture and others from the mid-1950s to the late 1970s travelling from Europe and West Asia through South Asia such as Afghanistan, Pakistan, India, Nepal, Sri Lanka, Bangladesh to Thailand. The hippie trail was a form of alternative tourism, and one of the key elements was travelling as cheaply as possible, mainly to extend the length of time away from home. The term "hippie" became current in the mid-to-late 1960s; "beatnik" was the previous term from the later 1950s.

In every major stop of the hippie trail, there were hotels, restaurants and cafés for Westerners, who networked with each other as they travelled east and west. The hippies tended to interact more with the local population than traditional sightseers did.

The hippie trail largely ended in the late 1970s primarily due to both the Iranian Revolution resulting in an anti-Western government, and the Soviet invasion of Afghanistan, closing the route to Western travelers.

Routes
Journeys would typically start from cities in western Europe, often London, Copenhagen, West Berlin, Paris, Amsterdam, or Milan. Many from the United States took Icelandic Airlines to Luxembourg. Most journeys passed through Istanbul, where routes divided. The usual northern route passed through Tehran, Herat, Kandahar, Kabul, Peshawar and Lahore on to India, Nepal and Southeast Asia. An alternative route was from Turkey via Syria, Jordan, and Iraq to Iran and Pakistan. All travellers had to cross through the Khyber Pass, traversing Peshawar and Lahore in Pakistan and over the Pakistan-India border at Ganda Singh Wala (or later at Wagah). 

Common destinations in the east included Delhi, Varanasi (then Benares), Goa, Bombay, Madras, Kathmandu and  Bangkok. Kathmandu still has a road, Jhochhen Tole, nicknamed Freak Street in commemoration of the many thousands of hippies who passed through. Further travel to southern India, Kovalam beach in Trivandrum (Kerala), to Sri Lanka (then called Ceylon), and points east and south to Australia was sometimes also undertaken.

Beyond the major route, Jimi Hendrix also popularized Essaouira as a hippie destination in Morocco.

Methods of travel
To keep costs low, journeys were carried out by hitchhiking, or cheap, private buses that travelled the route. There were also trains that travelled part of the way, particularly across Eastern Europe through Turkey (with a ferry connection across Lake Van) and to Tehran or east to Mashhad, Iran. From these cities, public or private transportation could then be obtained for the remainder of the trip. The bulk of travellers were Western Europeans, North Americans, Australians, and Japanese. Ideas and experiences were exchanged in well-known hostels, hotels, and other gathering spots along the way, such as Yener's Café and The Pudding Shop in Istanbul, Sigi's on Chicken Street in Kabul or the Amir Kabir in Tehran. Many used backpacks and, while the majority were young, older people and families occasionally travelled the route. A number drove the entire distance.

Hippies tended to travel light, seeking to pick up and go wherever the action was at any time. Hippies did not worry about money, hotel reservations or other such standard travel planning. A derivative of this style of travel were the hippie trucks and buses, hand-crafted mobile houses built on a truck or bus chassis to facilitate a nomadic lifestyle. Some of these mobile homes were quite elaborate, with beds, toilets, showers and cooking facilities.

Decline of the trail
The hippie trail came to an end in the late 1970s with political changes in previously hospitable countries. In 1979, both the Iranian Revolution and the Soviet invasion of Afghanistan closed the overland route to South Asia for Western travellers, and Chitral and Kashmir became less inviting due to tensions and territorial conflicts in the area. Meagan Day summarized that "radio stations in Iran swapped Blue Öyster Cult for speeches by Ayatollah Khomeini." Other factors that led to difficult conditions for travellers were the Saur Revolution (1978), and the advent of a military dictatorship in Pakistan (1977) that banned many hippie attractions. 

In the Middle Eastern route, the Yom Kippur War in 1973 also put in place strict visa restrictions for Western citizens in Syria, Iraq and Lebanon. The Lebanese Civil War had already broken out in 1975. Richard Nixon started a drug war which also included cannabis. Due to the constant pressure from USA, in 1976 Nepal enacted Narcotic Drugs (Control) Act  prohibiting the trade, farming or any kind of cannabis activities in the country.

Locals also became increasingly wary of Western travellers – notably in the region between Kabul and Peshawar, where residents became increasingly frightened and repulsed by unkempt hippies who were drawn to the region for its famed opium and wild cannabis.

Travel organizers Sundowners and Topdeck pioneered a route through Balochistan. Topdeck continued its trips throughout the Iran–Iraq War and later conflicts, but took its last trip in 1998.

From the mid 2000s, the route has again become somewhat feasible, but continuing conflict and tensions in Iraq and Afghanistan mean the route is much more difficult and risky to negotiate than in its heyday. In September 2007, Ozbus embarked upon a short-lived service between London and Sydney over the route of the hippie trail, and commercial trips were offered in 2010 between Europe and Asia, bypassing Iraq, Afghanistan, and Pakistan, by going through Nepal and China to the old Silk Road.

Guides and travelogues 
The BIT Guide, recounting collective experiences and reproduced at a fairly low cost, produced the early duplicated stapled-together "foolscap bundle" with a pink cover providing information for travellers and updated by those on the road, warning of pitfalls and places to see and stay. BIT, under Geoff Crowther (who later joined Lonely Planet), lasted from 1972 until the last edition in 1980. The 1971 edition of The Whole Earth Catalog devoted a page to the "Overland Guide to Nepal." In 1973 Tony Wheeler and his wife Maureen Wheeler, the creators of the Lonely Planet guidebooks, produced a publication about the hippie trail called Across Asia On The Cheap. They wrote this 94-page pamphlet based upon travel experiences gained by crossing Western Europe, the Balkans, Turkey and Iran from London in a minivan. After having travelled through these regions, they sold the van in Afghanistan and continued on a succession of chicken buses, third-class trains and long-distance trucks. They crossed Pakistan, India, Nepal, Thailand, Malaysia and Indonesia and arrived nine months later in Sydney with a combined 27 cents in their pockets.

Paul Theroux wrote a classic account of the route in The Great Railway Bazaar (1975). Two more recent travel books — The Wrong Way Home (1999) by Peter Moore and Magic Bus (2008) by Rory Maclean — also retrace the original hippie trail.

In popular culture
The 1981 song "Down Under" by Australian rock band Men at Work sets out with a scene on the hippie trail while under the influence of marijuana: "Travelling in a fried-out Kombi, on a hippie trail, head full of zombie."

The Rolling Stones song "Sympathy for the Devil" appears to reference the dangers of traveling along the Hippie Trail in the 1960s, in the lines "And I laid traps for troubadours / Who get killed before they reached Bombay."

Charles Sobhraj's crimes along the trail are depicted in the 2021 eight-part BBC drama series The Serpent. Bollywood hit movie of 1971 Haré Rama Haré Krishna focussed on girl from broken family falling for drug addiction while in company of hippies in Kathmandu. The movie directed by legendary actor Dev Anand has anti-drug message and shot actress Zeenat Aman to fame. The movie title song Dum Maro Dum is a popular song in India.

See also
 AH1
 Banana Pancake Trail
 Globe Trekker
 Grand Tour – 17th–19th century Continental tour undertaken by young European aristocrats, partly as leisure and partly educational.
 Gringo Trail
 India–United Kingdom bus routes
 Indomania
 Oxford and Cambridge Far Eastern Expedition
 Silk Road

References

Further reading
.
.
 Dring, Simon (1995) On the Road Again BBC Books 
 A Season in Heaven: True Tales from the Road to Kathmandu (compiled by David Tomory) - accounts by people who made the trip, mostly in search of enlightenment.
 Hall, Michael (2007) Remembering the Hippie Trail: travelling across Asia 1976-1978, Island Publications 
 Silberman, Dan (2013) In the Footsteps of Iskander: Going to India, Amazon.com, Amazon.UK

External links 

"Road to Goa - pics and stories from a 70s 'trail' bus driver"
"The Hippie Trail - The Road to Paradise"
Steve Abrams' Diary of trip from 1967
"Beyond the Beach - An Ethnography of Modern Travellers in Asia"
"On the Hippie Trail" - an impression from 1968
"From the Netherlands to Nepal - and back again" 1977-78
Overland from London to Kathmandu in a Double Decker bus 1980-1981
Alternative Society 1970s: BIT Travel Guide
Video footage of Hippie Kathmandu from 1975
Hippie Trail resources

Trails
Hippie movement
Scenic routes
Types of tourism